Terellia colon is a species of tephritid or fruit flies in the genus Terellia of the family Tephritidae.

Distribution
United Kingdom, Sweden, Siberia North Africa, Israel & Kazakhstan.

References

Tephritinae
Insects described in 1826
Diptera of Europe
Diptera of Asia